Sergio Pellizzaro Domenicacci, known as Sergio Pellizzaro (born 1 March 1945 in Montebello Vicentino) is a retired Italian professional footballer who played as a midfielder.

References

1945 births
Living people
Italian footballers
Serie A players
Serie B players
Mantova 1911 players
Empoli F.C. players
A.S. Roma players
U.S. Catanzaro 1929 players
Palermo F.C. players
Inter Milan players
Atalanta B.C. players
A.C. Perugia Calcio players
Rimini F.C. 1912 players

Association football midfielders